Victoria Hale founded the nonprofit pharmaceutical company The Institute for OneWorld Health in San Francisco, California in 2000 and was its chairman and CEO until 2008, when she became Chair Emeritus.  She then went on to found Medicines360, a nonprofit pharmaceutical company dedicated to developing medicines for women and children, including pregnant women.

Life
Hale earned her Ph.D. in pharmaceutical chemistry from the UCSF School of Pharmacy.  She is an Adjunct Associate professor in Biopharmaceutical Sciences at UCSF, and an advisor to the World Health Organization (WHO).

Her past affiliations include the U.S. Food and Drug Administration's Center for Drug Evaluation and Research, and Genentech.

Awards
2004 Schwab Fellow of the World Economic Forum (awarded by the Schwab Foundation for Social Entrepreneurship) Profile
2005 Economist Innovation Award for Social and Economic Innovation (From The Economist magazine)
2006 MacArthur Fellow
2006 Ashoka Fellow
2007 One of Glamour Magazine's Women of the Year for her work developing and providing pharmaceutical care to the world's poor (http://www.glamour.com/news/woty/articles/2007/11/victoria_hale)

References
OneWorld Health team profiles

Bibliography
Buse, Uwe Die Achse des Guten in der Spiegel nr. 48/27 Nov. 2006 (German language)

External links
Medicines360 official website
The Institute for OneWorld Heath official website
MacArthur Fellow profile
Victoria Hale, an uncommon hero eradicating black fever, video by the Skoll Foundation

Year of birth missing (living people)
Living people
MacArthur Fellows
University of California, San Francisco alumni
University of California, San Francisco faculty
Winners of The Economist innovation awards
University of Maryland, Baltimore alumni
Members of the National Academy of Medicine
Ashoka USA Fellows